George William Sherrington (18 November 1890 – 1977) worked in various roles at York City Football Club, England, where he was dubbed 'Mr. York City'.

Career
Sherrington was one of the founders of York City and was an original director. He was appointed as honorary secretary in 1924. He relinquished his seat on the board in February 1930 and was appointed as full-time secretary. He combined his work as secretary with those of manager in the early 1930s. He also did this in the mid-1950s, during York City's semi-final FA Cup run, when he shared managerial duties with Tom Lockie. He received the Football League's long service medal in 1951. He retired in 1961 and became the club's president until he died in 1977. Due to his lifetime of service to the club, he was named 'Mr. York City'.

Managerial statistics

References

1890 births
People from Blaydon-on-Tyne
1977 deaths
English football managers
York City F.C. managers
English Football League managers
English football chairmen and investors
York City F.C. directors and chairmen
20th-century English businesspeople